Emanuel Juan Cruz Hermida (born in Argentina) is an Argentine footballer currently playing for Ferro Carril Oeste of the Primera B Nacional in Argentina.

Teams
 Platense 2007
 Juventud Las Piedras 2007
 Unión y Sociedad Italiana de Álvarez 2008
 San Luis de Quillota 2008
 Unión y Sociedad Italiana de Álvarez 2009
 Ferrocarril Oeste de Alvear 2009-2010
 Guillermo Renny 2011
 Ferro Carril Oeste 2012–present

References
 
 

Living people
Argentine footballers
Argentine expatriate footballers
Ferro Carril Oeste footballers
Juventud de Las Piedras players
San Luis de Quillota footballers
Primera B de Chile players
Expatriate footballers in Chile
Expatriate footballers in Uruguay
Association footballers not categorized by position
Year of birth missing (living people)